The Type R ship is a United States Maritime Administration (MARAD) designation for World War II refrigerated cargo ship, also called a reefer ship. The R type ship was used in World War II, Korean War, Vietnam War and the Cold War. Type R ships were used to transport perishable commodities which require temperature-controlled transportation, such as fruit, meat, fish, vegetables, dairy products and other foods. The US Maritime Commission ordered 41 new refrigerated ships for the US Navy. Because of the difficulty of building refrigerated ships only two were delivered in 1944, and just 26 were delivered in 1945 and the remainder in 1946–48. The 41 R type ships were built in four groups. Two of design types were modified type C1 ships and two were modified type C2 ships. The United Fruit Company operated many of the R type ships in World War II. The type R2-S-BV1 became the US Navy Alstede-class stores ship and the type R1-M-AV3 became the US Navy Adria-class stores ship.

Ships in type

R2-S-BV1
R2-S-BV1 Alstede-class stores ship, built by Moore Dry Dock Company of Oakland, California in 1945. Used carrying frozen meat to Allied forces in World War II. Hull is close to C2-SU type ships. Displacement: 6,319 t.(lt), length: , beam: , draft: , speed:  max., crew complement: 64, propulsion: cross-compound turbines, single propeller.
 SS Matchless renamed  in 1952 
 SS Flying Dragon   Scrapped 1974
 SS Ocean Chief renamed  in 1946
 SS Fleetwood renamed  in 1961
 SS Contest    Scrapped 1973
 SS Golden Rocket renamed  in 1946
 SS Golden Eagle renamed   sunk as a target on 24 July 1997

R2-ST-AU1
R2-ST-AU1 , built by Gulf Shipbuilding Corporation in Chickasaw, Alabama in 1945–1946. Also had accommodations for twelve passengers in six cabins. Owned by the United Mail Steamship Company. Ships were operated by United Fruit Company / Great White Fleet.
 SS Fra Berlanga scrapped 1971
 SS San Jose scrapped 1976
 SS Limon  later sold to NV Caribbean Shipping of Rotterdam and renamed SS Talamanca, scrapped in 1977
 SS Esparta scrapped 1977
 SS Junior scrapped 1975
 SS Comayagua scrapped 1975

R1-M-AV3
R1-M-AV3 Adria-class ship, built by Pennsylvania Shipyards, Inc. in Beaumont, Texas in 1944–1945, Hull was close to a type C1-M-AV1. Specs:  max, length: , beam: , draught: , diesel engine, single screw, .
 
  Sold in 1972 became fish factory ship
 
 
 
 
 
 
  Sold in 1966 became fish factory ship
 
 SS Flemish Bend renamed 
 SS Whale Knot  renamed 
 SS Wall and Crown renamed 
 
 SS Stevedore Knot renamed 
  Sold in 1972 became fish factory ship
  Sold in 1967 became fish factory ship

R2-ST-AU1
R2-ST-AU1 , built by Newport News Shipbuilding in Newport News, Virginia in 1947. Also called a banana boat. Length , beam: , depth: , draught:  and Refrigerated: . Owner and operator United Fruit Steamship Corporation Inc., New York, New York.
 SS Parismina Scrapped 1977
 SS Heredia renamed SS Tanamo, Scrapped 1977
 SS Metapan Scrapped 1977

R1-S-DH1
R1-S-DH1 Yaque class. , built Bethlehem Steel Sparrows Point, Maryland in 1947–1948, Engine: De Laval Turbine Company Inc., Trenton, New Jersey, Length: , derricks 9, winches 8. For United Fruit Company, Inc., New York, New York. Used to move tropical fruit and vegetables during war. Smallest of the R ships. Also had a few passenger cabins.
 SS Yaque Scrapped 1972
 SS Cibao Scrapped 1975
 SS Quisqueya Scrapped 1975
 SS Santo Cerro renamed SS Castilla 1969, Scrapped 1975
 SS Sixaola Scrapped 1978
 SS Tivives Scrapped 1968
 SS Hibueras Scrapped 1972
 SS Ulua Scrapped 1972
 SS Morazan Scrapped 1976

Notable incidents

SS Matchless, a R2-S-BV1, sold to the United States Navy in 1952 and renamed . She was sold and renamed Aleutian Monarch in 1979 as a fish factory ship. She caught fire, burning for five days and was scuttled on 12 November 1981 off Unalaska Island, Alaska.

Other World War reefers
 Due to the lack of refrigerated cargo ships, World War One and other refrigerated cargo ships were used for World War Two. The s were six United Fruit passenger and refrigerated cargo liners built in 1931–33 that the United States Maritime Commission requisitioned in 1941–42 for the war. Antigua, although requisitioned, was never commissioned into the Navy.
 Also requisitioned from the United Fruit Company was SS Ulua; which became . It was the last of the United Fruit Company reefer ships to be taken over for the war; near the end of April 1943 in San Francisco.
 The Danish reefer ships of the J. Lauritzen A/S shipping company seized in U.S. ports after Germany occupied Denmark: Australian Reefer, African Reefer and Maria.
 The company Concrete Ship Constructors Shipyard, in National City, California, built three concrete ships with reefer space. The three ships hulls, 45, 46 and 47 were completed with reefer capacity.

See also
 Victory ships
 Liberty ship
 Type C1 ship
 Type C2 ship
 Type C3 ship
 United States Merchant Marine Academy
 List of auxiliaries of the United States Navy

References

External links 
 

Ship types
World War II merchant ships of the United States